Lezlee Jean Westine (born August 28, 1960) is an American political advisor and attorney serving as the president and chief executive of Personal Care Products Council and a former Republican operative who worked for President George W. Bush.

Career
Westine began her career practicing political and election law in California for Nielsen, Merksamer, Parrinello, Mueller & Naylor. She then ran the northern California office of Governor Pete Wilson. Westine helped found Technet, a political network of high-level executives to promotes the growth of technology sector.

In 2001 she was selected to serve as Director of the Office of Public Liaison. During her time in office she attempted to improve the Bush Administration's favorability among women by arranging events around the country, at which leading businesswomen were introduced to high-ranking women in the Bush administration.

As an executive for PCPC, Westine's salary for 2012 was $920,592.00,

Personal life
Westine is the single mother of one daughter.

References

External links

1960 births
American women in politics
California Republicans
George W. Bush administration personnel
Georgetown University Law Center alumni
Living people
People from Hinsdale, Illinois
UCLA Anderson School of Management alumni
University of Florida alumni
Virginia Republicans
21st-century American women